Adeline Virginia Woolf (25 January 1882 28 March 1941) was an English writer, considered one of the most important modernist 20th-century authors and a pioneer in the use of stream of consciousness as a narrative device.

Woolf was born into an affluent household in South Kensington, London, the seventh child of Julia Prinsep Jackson and Leslie Stephen in a blended family of eight which included the modernist painter Vanessa Bell. She was home-schooled in English classics and Victorian literature from a young age. From 1897 to 1901, she attended the Ladies' Department of King's College London, where she studied classics and history and came into contact with early reformers of women's higher education and the women's rights movement.

Encouraged by her father, Woolf began writing professionally in 1900. After her father's death in 1904, the Stephen family moved from Kensington to the more bohemian Bloomsbury, where, in conjunction with the brothers' intellectual friends, they formed the artistic and literary Bloomsbury Group. In 1912, she married Leonard Woolf, and in 1917, the couple founded the Hogarth Press, which published much of her work. They rented a home in Sussex and moved there permanently in 1940. Woolf had romantic relationships with women, including Vita Sackville-West, who also published her books through Hogarth Press. Both women's literature became inspired by their relationship, which lasted until Woolf's death.

During the inter-war period, Woolf was an important part of London's literary and artistic society. In 1915, she had published her first novel, The Voyage Out, through her half-brother's publishing house, Gerald Duckworth and Company. Her best-known works include the novels Mrs Dalloway (1925), To the Lighthouse (1927) and Orlando (1928). She is also known for her essays, including A Room of One's Own (1929). Woolf became one of the central subjects of the 1970s movement of feminist criticism and her works have since attracted much attention and widespread commentary for "inspiring feminism". Her works have been translated into more than 50 languages. A large body of literature is dedicated to her life and work, and she has been the subject of plays, novels and films. Woolf is commemorated today by statues, societies dedicated to her work and a building at the University of London.

Throughout her life, Woolf was troubled by mental illness. She was institutionalised several times and attempted suicide at least twice. According to Dalsimer (2004), her illness was characterised by symptoms that would today be diagnosed as bipolar disorder, for which there was no effective treatment during her lifetime. In 1941, at age 59, Woolf died by drowning herself in the River Ouse at Lewes.

Life

Family origin 

Virginia Woolf was born Adeline Virginia Stephen on 25 January 1882 at 22 Hyde Park Gate in South Kensington, London, to Julia (née Jackson) (1846–1895) and Sir Leslie Stephen (1832–1904), writer, historian, essayist, biographer, and mountaineer. Julia Jackson was born in 1846 in Calcutta, British India, to John Jackson and Maria "Mia" Theodosia Pattle, from two Anglo-Indian families. John Jackson FRCS was the third son of George Jackson and Mary Howard of Bengal, a physician who spent 25 years with the Bengal Medical Service and East India Company and a professor at the fledgling Calcutta Medical College. While John Jackson was an almost invisible presence, the Pattle family were famous beauties, and moved in the upper circles of Bengali society. The seven Pattle sisters married into important families. Julia Margaret Cameron was a celebrated photographer, while Virginia married Earl Somers, and their daughter, Julia Jackson's cousin, was Lady Henry Somerset, the temperance leader. Julia moved to England with her mother at the age of two and spent much of her early life with another of her mother's sisters, Sarah Monckton Pattle. Sarah and her husband Henry Thoby Prinsep, conducted an artistic and literary salon at Little Holland House where she came into contact with a number of Pre-Raphaelite painters such as Edward Burne-Jones, for whom she modelled.

Julia was the youngest of three sisters, and Adeline Virginia was named after her mother's eldest sister Adeline Maria Jackson (1837–1881) and her mother's aunt Virginia Pattle (see Pattle family tree). Because of the tragedy of her aunt Adeline's death the previous year, the family never used Virginia's first name. The Jacksons were a well educated, literary and artistic proconsular middle-class family. In 1867, Julia Jackson married Herbert Duckworth, a barrister, but within three years was left a widow with three infant children. She was devastated and entered a prolonged period of mourning, abandoning her faith and turning to nursing and philanthropy. Julia and Herbert Duckworth had three children:
 George (5 March 1868 – 27 April 1934), a senior civil servant, married Lady Margaret Herbert in 1904
 Stella (30 May 1869 – 19 July 1897), died aged 28
 Gerald (29 October 1870 – 28 September 1937), founder of Duckworth Publishing, married Cecil Alice Scott-Chad in 1921

Leslie Stephen was born in 1832 in South Kensington to Sir James and Lady Jane Catherine Stephen (née Venn), daughter of John Venn, rector of Clapham. The Venns were the centre of the evangelical Clapham Sect. Sir James Stephen was the under secretary at the Colonial Office, and with another Clapham member, William Wilberforce, was responsible for the passage of the Slavery Abolition Bill in 1833. In 1849 he was appointed Regius Professor of Modern History at the University of Cambridge. As a family of educators, lawyers, and writers the Stephens represented the elite intellectual aristocracy. While his family were distinguished and intellectual, they were less colourful and aristocratic than Julia Jackson's. A graduate and fellow of Cambridge University he renounced his faith and position to move to London where he became a notable man of letters. In addition, he was a rambler and mountaineer, described as a "gaunt figure with the ragged red brown beard...a formidable man, with an immensely high forehead, steely-blue eyes, and a long pointed nose." In the same year as Julia Jackson's marriage, he wed Harriet Marian (Minny) Thackeray (1840–1875), youngest daughter of William Makepeace Thackeray, who bore him a daughter, Laura (1870–1945), but died in childbirth in 1875. Laura was developmentally disabled and eventually institutionalized.

The widowed Julia Duckworth knew Leslie Stephen through her friendship with Minny's elder sister Anne (Anny) Isabella Ritchie and had developed an interest in his agnostic writings. She was present the night Minny died and later, tended to Leslie Stephen and helped him move next door to her on Hyde Park Gate so Laura could have some companionship with her own children. Both were preoccupied with mourning and although they developed a close friendship and intense correspondence, agreed it would go no further. Leslie Stephen proposed to her in 1877, an offer she declined, but when Anny married later that year she accepted him and they were married on 26 March 1878. He and Laura then moved next door into Julia's house, where they lived till his death in 1904. Julia was 32 and Leslie was 46.

Their first child, Vanessa, was born on 30 May 1879. Julia, having presented her husband with a child and now having five children to care for, decided to limit her family's growth. However, despite the fact that the couple took "precautions," "contraception was a very imperfect art in the nineteenth century:" it resulted in the birth of three more children over the next four years.

22 Hyde Park Gate (1882–1904)

1882–1895 
Virginia Woolf provides insight into her early life in her autobiographical essays, including Reminiscences (1908), 22 Hyde Park Gate (1921), and A Sketch of the Past (1940). Other essays that provide insight into this period include Leslie Stephen (1932). She also alludes to her childhood in her fictional writing. In To the Lighthouse (1927), her depiction of the life of the Ramsays in the Hebrides is an only thinly disguised account of the Stephens in Cornwall and the Godrevy Lighthouse they would visit there. However, Woolf's understanding of her mother and family evolved considerably between 1907 and 1940, in which the somewhat distant, yet revered figure of her mother becomes more nuanced and filled in.

In February 1891, with her sister Vanessa, Woolf began the Hyde Park Gate News, chronicling life and events within the Stephen family, and modelled on the popular magazine Tit-Bits. Initially, this was mainly Vanessa's and Thoby's articles, but very soon Virginia became the main contributor, with Vanessa as editor. Their mother's response when it first appeared was "Rather clever I think." Virginia would run the Hyde Park Gate News until 1895, the time of her mother's death. The following year the Stephen sisters also used photography to supplement their insights, as did Stella Duckworth. Vanessa Bell's 1892 portrait of her sister and parents in the Library at Talland House (see image) was one of the family's favourites and was written about lovingly in Leslie Stephen's memoir. In 1897 ("the first really lived year of my life)" Virginia began her first diary, which she kept for the next twelve years, and a notebook in 1909.

Virginia was, as she describes it, "born into a large connection, born not of rich parents, but of well-to-do parents, born into a very communicative, literate, letter writing, visiting, articulate, late nineteenth century world." It was a well-connected family consisting of six children, with two half brothers and a half sister (the Duckworths, from her mother's first marriage), another half sister, Laura (from her father's first marriage), and an older sister, Vanessa, and brother Thoby. The following year, another brother Adrian followed. The disabled Laura Stephen lived with the family until she was institutionalized in 1891. Julia and Leslie had four children together:
 Vanessa "Nessa" (30 May 1879 – 1961), married Clive Bell in 1907
 Thoby (9 September 1880 – 1906), founded Bloomsbury Group
 Virginia "Jinny"/"Ginia" (25 January 1882 – 1941), married Leonard Woolf in 1912
 Adrian (27 October 1883 – 1948), married Karin Costelloe in 1914

Virginia was born at 22 Hyde Park Gate and lived there until her father's death in 1904. Number 22 Hyde Park Gate, South Kensington, lay at the south-east end of Hyde Park Gate, a narrow cul-de-sac running south from Kensington Road, just west of the Royal Albert Hall, and opposite Kensington Gardens and Hyde Park, where the family regularly took their walks (see Map; Street plan). Built in 1846 by Henry Payne of Hammersmith as one of a row of single-family townhouses for the upper middle class, it soon became too small for their expanding family. At the time of their marriage, it consisted of a basement, two storeys, and an attic. In July 1886 Leslie Stephen obtained the services of J. W. Penfold, an architect, to add additional living space above and behind the existing structure. The substantial renovations added a new top floor (see image of red brick extension), with three bedrooms and a study for himself, converted the original attic into rooms, and added the first bathroom. It was a tall but narrow townhouse, that at that time had no running water. Virginia would later describe it as "a very tall house on the left-hand side near the bottom which begins by being stucco and ends by being red brick; which is so high and yet—as I can say now that we have sold it—so rickety that it seems as if a very high wind would topple it over."

The servants worked "downstairs" in the basement. The ground floor had a drawing room, separated by a curtain from the servant's pantry and a library. Above this on the first floor were Julia and Leslie's bedrooms. On the next floor were the Duckworth children's rooms, and above them, the day and night nurseries of the Stephen children occupied two further floors. Finally, in the attic, under the eaves, were the servants' bedrooms, accessed by a back staircase. Life at 22 Hyde Park Gate was also divided symbolically; as Virginia put it, "The division in our lives was curious. Downstairs there was pure convention: upstairs pure intellect. But there was no connection between them," the worlds typified by George Duckworth and Leslie Stephen. Their mother, it seems, was the only one who could span this divide. The house was described as dimly lit and crowded with furniture and paintings. Within it, the younger Stephens formed a close-knit group. Despite this, the children still held their grievances. Virginia envied Adrian for being their mother's favourite. Virginia and Vanessa's status as creatives (writing and art respectively) caused a rivalry between them at times. Life in London differed sharply from their summers in Cornwall, their outdoor activities consisting mainly of walks in nearby Kensington Gardens, where they would play hide-and-seek and sail their boats on the Round Pond, while indoors, it revolved around their lessons.

Leslie Stephen's eminence as an editor, critic, and biographer, and his connection to William Thackeray, meant his children were raised in an environment filled with the influences of a Victorian literary society. Henry James, George Henry Lewes, Alfred Lord Tennyson, Thomas Hardy, Edward Burne-Jones, and Virginia's honorary godfather, James Russell Lowell, were among the visitors to the house. Julia Stephen was equally well connected. Her aunt was a pioneering early photographer, Julia Margaret Cameron, who was also a visitor to the Stephen household. The two Stephen sisters, Vanessa and Virginia, were almost three years apart in age. Virginia christened her older sister "the saint" and was far more inclined to exhibit her cleverness than her more reserved sister. Virginia resented the domesticity Victorian tradition forced on them far more than her sister. They also competed for Thoby's affections. Virginia would later confess her ambivalence over this rivalry to Duncan Grant in 1917: "indeed one of the concealed worms of my life has been a sister's jealousy – of a sister I mean; and to feed this I have invented such a myth about her that I scarce know one from t'other."

Virginia showed an early affinity for writing. Although both parents disapproved of formal education for females, writing was considered a respectable profession for women, and her father encouraged her in this respect. Later, she would describe this as "ever since I was a little creature, scribbling a story in the manner of Hawthorne on the green plush sofa in the drawing room at St. Ives while the grown-ups dined". By the age of five, she was writing letters and could tell her father a story every night. Later, she, Vanessa, and Adrian would develop the tradition of inventing a serial about their next-door neighbours, every night in the nursery, or in the case of St. Ives, of spirits that resided in the garden. It was her fascination with books that formed the strongest bond between her and her father. For her tenth birthday, she received an ink-stand, a blotter, drawing book, and a box of writing implements.

Talland House (1882–1894) 

Leslie Stephen was in the habit of hiking in Cornwall, and in the spring of 1881 he came across a large white house in St Ives, Cornwall, and took out a lease on it that September. Although it had limited amenities, its main attraction was the view overlooking Porthminster Bay towards the Godrevy Lighthouse, which the young Virginia could see from the upper windows and was to be the central figure in her To the Lighthouse (1927). It was a large square house, with a terraced garden, divided by hedges, sloping down towards the sea. Each year between 1882 and 1894 from mid-July to mid-September the Stephen family leased Talland House as a summer residence. Leslie Stephen, who referred to it thus: "a pocket-paradise", described it as "The pleasantest of my memories... refer to our summers, all of which were passed in Cornwall, especially to the thirteen summers (1882–1894) at St Ives. There we bought the lease of Talland House: a small but roomy house, with a garden of an acre or two all up and down hill, with quaint little terraces divided by hedges of escallonia, a grape-house and kitchen-garden and a so-called 'orchard' beyond". It was in Leslie's words, a place of "intense domestic happiness". Virginia herself described the house in great detail:

In both London and Cornwall, Julia was perpetually entertaining, and was notorious for her manipulation of her guests' lives, constantly matchmaking in the belief everyone should be married, the domestic equivalence of her philanthropy. As her husband observed, "My Julia was of course, though with all due reserve, a bit of a matchmaker." Amongst their guests in 1893 were the Brookes, whose children, including Rupert Brooke, played with the Stephen children. Rupert and his group of Cambridge Neo-pagans would come to play an important role in their lives in the years before the First World War. While Cornwall was supposed to be a summer respite, Julia Stephen soon immersed herself in the work of caring for the sick and poor there, as well as in London. Both at Hyde Park Gate and Talland House, the family mingled with much of the country's literary and artistic circles. Frequent guests included literary figures such as Henry James and George Meredith, as well as James Russell Lowell, and the children were exposed to much more intellectual conversations than at their mother's Little Holland House. The family did not return, following Julia Stephen's death in May 1895.

For the children, it was the highlight of the year, and Virginia's most vivid childhood memories were not of London but of Cornwall. In a diary entry of 22 March 1921, she described why she felt so connected to Talland House, looking back to a summer day in August 1890. "Why am I so incredibly and incurably romantic about Cornwall? One's past, I suppose; I see children running in the garden … The sound of the sea at night … almost forty years of life, all built on that, permeated by that: so much I could never explain". Cornwall inspired aspects of her work, in particular the "St Ives Trilogy" of Jacob's Room (1922), To the Lighthouse (1927), and The Waves (1931).

1895–1904 

Julia Stephen fell ill with influenza in February 1895, and never properly recovered, dying on 5 May, when Virginia was 13. It was a pivotal moment in her life and the beginning of her struggles with mental illness. Essentially, her life had fallen apart. The Duckworths were travelling abroad at the time of their mother's death, and Stella returned immediately to take charge and assume her role. That summer, rather than return to the memories of St Ives, the Stephens went to Freshwater, Isle of Wight, where some of their mother's relatives lived. It was there that Virginia had the first of her many nervous breakdowns, and Vanessa was forced to assume some of her mother's role in caring for Virginia's mental state. Stella became engaged to Jack Hills the following year and they were married on 10 April 1897, making Virginia even more dependent on her older sister.

George Duckworth also assumed some of their mother's role, taking upon himself the task of bringing them out into society. First Vanessa, then Virginia, in both cases an equal disaster, for it was not a rite of passage that resonated with either girl and attracted a scathing critique by Virginia regarding the conventional expectations of young upper-class women: "Society in those days was a perfectly competent, perfectly complacent, ruthless machine. A girl had no chance against its fangs. No other desires – say to paint, or to write – could be taken seriously." Rather her priorities were to escape from the Victorian conventionality of the downstairs drawing room to a "room of one's own" to pursue her writing aspirations. She would revisit this criticism in her depiction of Mrs. Ramsay stating the duties of a Victorian mother in To the Lighthouse "an unmarried woman has missed the best of life".

The death of Stella Duckworth on 19 July 1897, after a long illness, was a further blow to Virginia's sense of self, and the family dynamics. Woolf described the period following the death of both her mother and Stella as "1897–1904 – the seven unhappy years," referring to "the lash of a random unheeding flail that pointlessly and brutally killed the two people who should, normally and naturally, have made those years, not perhaps happy but normal and natural". In April 1902, their father became ill, and although he underwent surgery later that year he never fully recovered, dying on 22 February 1904. Virginia's father's death precipitated a further breakdown. Later, Virginia would describe this time as one in which she was dealt successive blows as a "broken chrysalis" with wings still creased. Chrysalis occurs many times in Woolf's writing but the "broken chrysalis" was an image that became a metaphor for those exploring the relationship between Woolf and grief. At his death, Leslie Stephen's net worth was £15,715 6s. 6d. (probate 23 March 1904)

Education 
In the late 19th century, education was sharply divided along gender lines, a tradition that Virginia would note and condemn in her writing. Boys were sent to school, and in upper-middle-class families such as the Stephens, it involved private boys schools, often boarding schools, and university. Girls, if they were afforded the luxury of education, received it from their parents, governesses, and tutors. Virginia was educated by her parents who shared the duty. There was a small classroom off the back of the drawing room, with its many windows, which they found perfect for quiet writing and painting. Julia taught the children Latin, French, and history, while Leslie taught them mathematics. They also received piano lessons. Supplementing their lessons was the children's unrestricted access to Leslie Stephen's vast library, exposing them to much of the literary canon, resulting in a greater depth of reading than any of their Cambridge contemporaries, Virginia's reading being described as "greedy." Later, she would recall  After public school, the boys in the family all attended the University of Cambridge. The girls derived some indirect benefit from this, as the boys introduced them to their friends. Another source was the conversation of their father's friends, to whom they were exposed. Leslie Stephen described his circle as "most of the literary people of mark...clever young writers and barristers, chiefly of the radical persuasion...we used to meet on Wednesday and Sunday evenings, to smoke and drink and discuss the universe and the reform movement".

Later, between the ages of 15 and 19, Virginia was able to pursue higher education. She took courses of study, some at degree level, in beginning and advanced Ancient Greek, intermediate Latin and German, together with continental and English history at the Ladies' Department of King's College London at nearby 13 Kensington Square between 1897 and 1901. She studied Greek under the eminent scholar George Charles Winter Warr, professor of Classical Literature at King's. In addition she had private tutoring in German, Greek, and Latin. One of her Greek tutors was Clara Pater (1899–1900), who taught at King's. Another was Janet Case, who involved her in the women's rights movement, and whose obituary Virginia would later write in 1937. Her experiences led to her 1925 essay "On Not Knowing Greek." Her time at King's also brought her into contact with some of the early reformers of women's higher education such as the principal of the Ladies' Department, Lilian Faithfull (one of the so-called steamboat ladies), in addition to Pater. Her sister Vanessa also enrolled at the Ladies' Department (1899–1901). Although the Stephen girls could not attend Cambridge, they were to be profoundly influenced by their brothers' experiences there. When Thoby went to Trinity in 1899, he befriended a circle of young men, including Clive Bell, Lytton Strachey, Leonard Woolf (whom Virginia would later marry), and Saxon Sydney-Turner, whom he would soon introduce to his sisters at the Trinity May Ball in 1900. These men formed a reading group they named the Midnight Society.

Relationships with family 
Although Virginia expressed the opinion that her father was her favourite parent, and although she had only turned thirteen when her mother died, she was profoundly influenced by her mother throughout her life. It was Virginia who famously stated that "for we think back through our mothers if we are women", and invoked the image of her mother repeatedly throughout her life in her diaries, her letters and a number of her autobiographical essays, including Reminiscences (1908), 22 Hyde Park Gate (1921) and A Sketch of the Past (1940), frequently evoking her memories with the words "I see her ...". She also alludes to her childhood in her fictional writing. In To the Lighthouse (1927), the artist, Lily Briscoe, attempts to paint Mrs. Ramsay, a complex character based on Julia Stephen, and repeatedly comments on the fact that she was "astonishingly beautiful". Her depiction of the life of the Ramsays in the Hebrides is an only thinly disguised account of the Stephens in Cornwall and the Godrevy Lighthouse they would visit there. However, Woolf's understanding of her mother and family evolved considerably between 1907 and 1940, in which the somewhat distant, yet revered figure becomes more nuanced and complete.

While her father painted Julia Stephen's work in terms of reverence, Woolf drew a sharp distinction between her mother's work and "the mischievous philanthropy which other women practise so complacently and often with such disastrous results." She describes her degree of sympathy, engagement, judgement, and decisiveness, and her sense of both irony and the absurd. She recalls trying to recapture "the clear round voice, or the sight of the beautiful figure, so upright and distinct, in its long shabby cloak, with the head held at a certain angle, so that the eye looked straight out at you." Julia Stephen dealt with her husband's depressions and his need for attention, which created resentment in her children, boosted his self-confidence, nursed her parents in their final illness, and had many commitments outside the home that would eventually wear her down. Her frequent absences and the demands of her husband instilled a sense of insecurity in her children that had a lasting effect on her daughters. In considering the demands on her mother, Woolf described her father as "fifteen years her elder, difficult, exacting, dependent on her," and reflected that it was at the expense of the amount of attention she could spare her young children: "a general presence rather than a particular person to a child." She reflected that she rarely ever spent a moment alone with her mother: "someone was always interrupting." Woolf was ambivalent about it, yet eager to separate herself from this model of utter selflessness. In To the Lighthouse, she describes it as "boasting of her capacity to surround and protect, there was scarcely a shell of herself left for her to know herself by; all was so lavished and spent." At the same time, she admired the strengths of her mother's womanly ideals. Given Julia's frequent absences and commitments, the young Stephen children became increasingly dependent on Stella Duckworth, who emulated her mother's selflessness; as Woolf wrote, "Stella was always the beautiful attendant handmaid ... making it the central duty of her life."

Julia Stephen greatly admired her husband's intellect. As Woolf observed "she never belittled her own works, thinking them, if properly discharged, of equal, though other, importance with her husband's." She believed with certainty in her role as the centre of her activities, and the person who held everything together, with a firm sense of what was important and valuing devotion. Of the two parents, Julia's "nervous energy dominated the family". While Virginia identified most closely with her father, Vanessa stated her mother was her favourite parent. Angelica Garnett recalls how Virginia asked Vanessa which parent she preferred, although Vanessa considered it a question that "one ought not to ask", she was unequivocal in answering "Mother" yet the centrality of her mother to Virginia's world is expressed in this description of her "Certainly there she was, in the very centre of that great Cathedral space which was childhood; there she was from the very first". Virginia observed that her half-sister, Stella, the oldest daughter, led a life of total subservience to her mother, incorporating her ideals of love and service. Virginia, like her father, quickly learned that being ill was the only reliable way of gaining the attention of her mother, who prided herself on her sickroom nursing.

Another issue the children had to deal with was Leslie Stephen's temper, Woolf describing him as "the tyrant father". Eventually, she became deeply ambivalent about him. He had given her his ring on her eighteenth birthday and she had a deep emotional attachment as his literary heir, writing about her "great devotion for him". Yet, like Vanessa, she also saw him as victimiser and tyrant. She had a lasting ambivalence towards him through her life, albeit one that evolved. Her adolescent image was of an "Eminent Victorian" and tyrant but as she grew older she began to realise how much of him was in her: "I have been dipping into old letters and father's memoirs....so candid and reasonable and transparent—and had such a fastidious delicate mind, educated, and transparent," she wrote 22 December 1940. She was in turn both fascinated and condemnatory of Leslie Stephen: "She [her mother] has haunted me: but then, so did that old wretch my father. . . . I was more like him than her, I think; and therefore more critical: but he was an adorable man, and somehow, tremendous."

Sexual abuse 
Woolf stated that she first remembers being molested by Gerald Duckworth when she was six years old. It has been suggested that this led to a lifetime of sexual fear and resistance to
masculine authority. Against a background of over-committed and distant parents, suggestions that this was a dysfunctional family must be evaluated. These include evidence of sexual abuse of the Stephen girls by their older Duckworth half-brothers, and by their cousin, James Kenneth Stephen (1859–1892), at least of Stella Duckworth. Laura is also thought to have been abused. The most graphic account is by Louise DeSalvo, but other authors and reviewers have been more cautious. Virginia's accounts of being continually sexually abused during the time that she lived at 22 Hyde Park Gate, have been cited by some critics as a possible cause of her mental health issues, although there are likely to be a number of contributing factors. Hermione Lee states that, "The evidence is strong enough, and yet ambiguous enough, to open the way for conflicting psychobiographical interpretations that draw quite different shapes of Virginia Woolf's interior life".

Bloomsbury (1904–1940)

Gordon Square (1904–1907) 

On their father's death, the Stephens' first instinct was to escape from the dark house of yet more mourning, and this they did immediately, accompanied by George, travelling to Manorbier, on the coast of Pembrokeshire on 27 February. There, they spent a month, and it was there that Virginia first came to realise her destiny was as a writer, as she recalls in her diary of 3 September 1922. They then further pursued their newfound freedom by spending April in Italy and France, where they met up with Clive Bell again. Virginia then suffered her second nervous breakdown, and first suicidal attempt on 10 May, and convalesced over the next three months.

Before their father died, the Stephens had discussed the need to leave South Kensington in the West End, with its tragic memories and their parents' relations. George Duckworth was 35, his brother Gerald 33. The Stephen children were now between 24 and 20. Virginia was 22. Vanessa and Adrian decided to sell 22 Hyde Park Gate in respectable South Kensington and move to Bloomsbury. Bohemian Bloomsbury, with its characteristic leafy squares seemed sufficiently far away, geographically and socially, and was a much cheaper neighbourhood rentwise. They had not inherited much and they were unsure about their finances. Also, Bloomsbury was close to the Slade School which Vanessa was then attending. While Gerald was quite happy to move on and find himself a bachelor establishment, George who had always assumed the role of quasi-parent decided to accompany them, much to their dismay. It was then that Lady Margaret Herbert appeared on the scene, George proposed, was accepted and married in September, leaving the Stephens to their own devices.

Vanessa found a house at 46 Gordon Square in Bloomsbury, and they moved in November, to be joined by Virginia now sufficiently recovered. It was at Gordon Square that the Stephens began to regularly entertain Thoby's intellectual friends in March 1905. The circle, which largely came from the Cambridge Apostles, included writers (Saxon Sydney-Turner, Lytton Strachey) and critics (Clive Bell, Desmond MacCarthy) with Thursday evening "At Homes" that became known as the Thursday Club, a vision of recreating Trinity College ("Cambridge in London"). This circle formed the nucleus of the intellectual circle of writers and artists known as the Bloomsbury Group. Later, it would include John Maynard Keynes (1907), Duncan Grant (1908), E.M. Forster (1910), Roger Fry (1910), Leonard Woolf (1911), and David Garnett (1914).

In 1905, Virginia and Adrian visited Portugal and Spain. Clive Bell proposed to Vanessa, but was declined, while Virginia began teaching evening classes at Morley College and Vanessa added another event to their calendar with the Friday Club, dedicated to the discussion of and later exhibition of the fine arts. This introduced some new people into their circle, including Vanessa's friends from the Royal Academy and Slade, such as Henry Lamb and Gwen Darwin (who became secretary), but also the eighteen-year-old Katherine Laird ("Ka") Cox (1887–1938), who was about to go up to Newnham. Although Virginia did not actually meet Ka until much later, Ka would come to play an important part in her life. Ka and others brought the Bloomsbury Group into contact with another, slightly younger, group of Cambridge intellectuals to whom the Stephen sisters gave the name "Neo-pagans". The Friday Club continued until 1913.

The following year, 1906, Virginia suffered two further losses. Her cherished brother Thoby, who was only 26, died of typhoid, following a trip they had all taken to Greece, and immediately afterward Vanessa accepted Clive's third proposal. Vanessa and Clive were married in February 1907 and as a couple, their interest in avant-garde art would have an important influence on Woolf's further development as an author. With Vanessa's marriage, Virginia and Adrian needed to find a new home.

Fitzroy Square (1907–1911) 
Virginia moved into 29 Fitzroy Square in April 1907, a house on the west side of the street, formerly occupied by George Bernard Shaw. It was in Fitzrovia, immediately to the west of Bloomsbury but still relatively close to her sister at Gordon Square. The two sisters continued to travel together, visiting Paris in March. Adrian was now to play a much larger part in Virginia's life, and they resumed the Thursday Club in October at their new home, while Gordon Square became the venue for the Play Reading Society in December. During this period, the group began to increasingly explore progressive ideas, first in speech, and then in conduct, Vanessa proclaiming in 1910 a libertarian society with sexual freedom for all.

Meanwhile, Virginia began work on her first novel, Melymbrosia, that eventually became The Voyage Out (1915). Vanessa's first child, Julian was born in February 1908, and in September Virginia accompanied the Bells to Italy and France. It was during this time that Virginia's rivalry with her sister resurfaced, flirting with Clive, which he reciprocated, and which lasted on and off from 1908 to 1914, by which time her sister's marriage was breaking down. On 17 February 1909, Lytton Strachey proposed to Virginia and she accepted, but he then withdrew the offer.

It was while she was at Fitzroy Square that the question arose of Virginia needing a quiet country retreat, and she required a six-week rest cure and sought the countryside away from London as much as possible. In December, she and Adrian stayed at Lewes and started exploring the area of Sussex around the town. She started to want a place of her own, like St Ives, but closer to London. She soon found a property in nearby Firle (see below), maintaining a relationship with that area for the rest of her life.

Dreadnought hoax 1910 

Several members of the group attained notoriety in 1910 with the Dreadnought hoax, which Virginia participated in disguised as a male Abyssinian royal. Her complete 1940 talk on the hoax was discovered and is published in the memoirs collected in the expanded edition of The Platform of Time (2008).

Brunswick Square (1911–1912) 
In October 1911, the lease on Fitzroy Square was running out and Virginia and Adrian decided to give up their home on Fitzroy Square in favour of a different living arrangement, moving to a four-storied house at 38 Brunswick Square in Bloomsbury proper in November. Virginia saw it as a new opportunity: "We are going to try all kinds of experiments," she told Ottoline Morrell. Adrian occupied the second floor, with Maynard Keynes and Duncan Grant sharing the ground floor. This arrangement for a single woman was considered scandalous, and George Duckworth was horrified. The house was adjacent to the Foundling Hospital, much to Virginia's amusement as an unchaperoned single woman. Originally, Ka Cox was supposed to share in the arrangements, but opposition came from Rupert Brooke, who was involved with her and pressured her to abandon the idea. At the house, Duncan Grant decorated Adrian Stephen's rooms (see image).

Marriage (1912–1941) 

Leonard Woolf was one of Thoby Stephen's friends at Trinity College, Cambridge, and noticed the Stephen sisters in Thoby's rooms there on their visits to the May Ball in 1900 and 1901. He recalls them in "white dresses and large hats, with parasols in their hands, their beauty literally took one's breath away". To him, they were silent, "formidable and alarming".

Woolf did not meet Virginia formally till 17 November 1904 when he dined with the Stephens at Gordon Square, to say goodbye before leaving to take up a position with the civil service in Ceylon, although she was aware of him through Thoby's stories. At that visit he noted that she was perfectly silent throughout the meal, and looked ill. In 1909, Lytton Strachey suggested to Woolf he should make her an offer of marriage. He did so, but received no answer. In June 1911, he returned to London on a one-year leave, but did not go back to Ceylon. In England again, Leonard renewed his contacts with family and friends. Three weeks after arriving he dined with Vanessa and Clive Bell at Gordon Square on 3 July, where they were later joined by Virginia and other members of what would later be called "Bloomsbury", and Leonard dates the group's formation to that night. In September, Virginia asked Leonard to join her at Little Talland House at Firle in Sussex for a long weekend. After that weekend, they began seeing each other more frequently.

On 4 December 1911, Leonard moved into the ménage on Brunswick Square, occupying a bedroom and sitting room on the fourth floor, and started to see Virginia constantly and by the end of the month had decided he was in love with her. On 11 January 1912, he proposed to her; she asked for time to consider, so he asked for an extension of his leave and, on being refused, offered his resignation on 25 April, effective 20 May. He continued to pursue Virginia, and in a letter of 1 May 1912 (which see) she explained why she did not favour a marriage. However, on 29 May, Virginia told Leonard that she wished to marry him, and they were married on 10 August at the St Pancras Register Office. It was during this time that Leonard first became aware of Virginia's precarious mental state. The Woolfs continued to live at Brunswick Square until October 1912, when they moved to a small flat at 13 Clifford's Inn, further to the east (subsequently demolished). Despite his low material status (Woolf referring to Leonard during their engagement as a "penniless Jew"), the couple shared a close bond. Indeed, in 1937, Woolf wrote in her diary: "Love-making—after 25 years can't bear to be separate ... you see it is enormous pleasure being wanted: a wife. And our marriage so complete." However, Virginia made a suicide attempt in 1913.

In October 1914, Leonard and Virginia Woolf moved away from Bloomsbury and central London to Richmond, living at 17 The Green, a home discussed by Leonard in his autobiography Beginning Again (1964). In early March 1915, the couple moved again, to nearby Hogarth House, Paradise Road, after which they named their publishing house. Virginia's first novel, The Voyage Out was published in 1915, followed by another suicide attempt. Despite the introduction of conscription in 1916, Leonard was exempted on medical grounds.

Between 1924 and 1940, the Woolfs returned to Bloomsbury, taking out a ten-year lease at 52 Tavistock Square, from where they ran the Hogarth Press from the basement, where Virginia also had her writing room, and is commemorated with a bust of her in the square (see illustration). 1925 saw the publication of Mrs Dalloway in May followed by her collapse while at Charleston in August. In 1927, her next novel, To the Lighthouse, was published, and the following year she lectured on Women & Fiction at Cambridge University and published Orlando in October. Her two Cambridge lectures then became the basis for her major essay A Room of One's Own in 1929. Virginia wrote only one drama, Freshwater, based on her great-aunt Julia Margaret Cameron, and produced at her sister's studio on Fitzroy Street in 1935. 1936 saw another collapse of her health following the completion of The Years.
	
The Woolf's final residence in London was at 37 Mecklenburgh Square (1939–1940), destroyed during the Blitz in September 1940; a month later their previous home on Tavistock Square was also destroyed. After that, they made Sussex their permanent home. For descriptions and illustrations of all Virginia Woolf's London homes, see Jean Moorcroft Wilson's book Virginia Woolf, Life and London: A Biography of Place (pub. Cecil Woolf, 1987).

Hogarth Press (1917–1938) 

Virginia had taken up book-binding as a pastime in October 1901, at the age of 19, and the Woolfs had been discussing setting up a publishing house for some time, and at the end of 1916 started making plans. Having discovered that they were not eligible to enroll in the St Bride School of Printing, they started purchasing supplies after seeking advice from the Excelsior Printing Supply Company on Farringdon Road in March 1917, and soon they had a printing press set up on their dining room table at Hogarth House, and the Hogarth Press was born.

Their first publication was Two Stories in July 1917, inscribed Publication No. 1, and consisted of two short stories, "The Mark on the Wall" by Virginia Woolf and Three Jews by Leonard Woolf. The work consisted of 32 pages, hand bound and sewn, and illustrated by woodcuts designed by Dora Carrington. The illustrations were a success, leading Virginia to remark that the press was "specially good at printing pictures, and we see that we must make a practice of always having pictures." (13 July 1917) The process took two and a half months with a production run of 150 copies. Other short short stories followed, including Kew Gardens (1919) with a woodblock by Vanessa Bell as frontispiece. Subsequently, Bell added further illustrations, adorning each page of the text.

The press subsequently published Virginia's novels along with works by T.S. Eliot, Laurens van der Post, and others. The Press also commissioned works by contemporary artists, including Dora Carrington and Vanessa Bell. Woolf believed that to break free of a patriarchal society women writers needed a "room of their own" to develop and often fantasised about an "Outsider's Society" where women writers would create a virtual private space for themselves via their writings to develop a feminist critique of society. Though Woolf never created the "Outsider's society", the Hogarth Press was the closest approximation as the Woolfs chose to publish books by writers that took unconventional points of view to form a reading community. Initially the press concentrated on small experimental publications, of little interest to large commercial publishers. Until 1930, Woolf often helped her husband print the Hogarth books as the money for employees was not there. Virginia relinquished her interest in 1938, following a third attempted suicide. After it was bombed in September 1940, the press was moved to Letchworth for the remainder of the war. Both the Woolfs were internationalists and pacifists who believed that promoting understanding between peoples was the best way to avoid another world war and chose quite consciously to publish works by foreign authors of whom the British reading public were unaware. The first non-British author to be published was the Soviet writer Maxim Gorky, the book Reminiscences of Leo Nikolaiovich Tolstoy in 1920, dealing with his friendship with Count Leo Tolstoy.

Memoir Club (1920–1941) 

1920 saw a postwar reconstitution of the Bloomsbury Group, under the title of the Memoir Club, which as the name suggests focussed on self-writing, in the manner of Proust's A La Recherche, and inspired some of the more influential books of the 20th century. The Group, which had been scattered by the war, was reconvened by Mary ('Molly') MacCarthy who called them "Bloomsberries", and operated under rules derived from the Cambridge Apostles, an elite university debating society that a number of them had been members of. These rules emphasised candour and openness. Among the 125 memoirs presented, Virginia contributed three that were published posthumously in 1976, in the autobiographical anthology Moments of Being. These were 22 Hyde Park Gate (1921), Old Bloomsbury (1922) and Am I a Snob? (1936).

Vita Sackville-West (1922–1941) 

The ethos of the Bloomsbury group encouraged a liberal approach to sexuality, and on 14 December 1922 Woolf met the writer and gardener Vita Sackville-West, wife of Harold Nicolson, while dining with Clive Bell. Writing in her diary the next day, she referred to meeting "the lovely gifted aristocratic Sackville West". At the time, Sackville-West was the more successful writer as both poet and novelist, commercially and critically, and it was not until after Woolf's death that she became considered the better writer. After a tentative start, they began a sexual relationship, which, according to Sackville-West in a letter to her husband on 17 August 1926, was only twice consummated. The relationship reached its peak between 1925 and 1928, evolving into more of a friendship through the 1930s, though Woolf was also inclined to brag of her affairs with other women within her intimate circle, such as Sibyl Colefax and Comtesse de Polignac. This period of intimacy was to prove fruitful for both authors, Woolf producing three novels, To the Lighthouse (1927), Orlando (1928), and The Waves (1931) as well as a number of essays, including "Mr. Bennett and Mrs. Brown" (1924) and "A Letter to a Young Poet" (1932).

Sackville-West worked tirelessly to lift Woolf's self-esteem, encouraging her not to view herself as a quasi-reclusive inclined to sickness who should hide herself away from the world, but rather offered praise for her liveliness and wit, her health, her intelligence and achievements as a writer. Sackville-West led Woolf to reappraise herself, developing a more positive self-image, and the feeling that her writings were the products of her strengths rather than her weakness. Starting at the age of 15, Woolf had believed the diagnosis by her father and his doctor that reading and writing were deleterious to her nervous condition, requiring a regime of physical labour such as gardening to prevent a total nervous collapse. This led Woolf to spend much time obsessively engaging in such physical labour.

Sackville-West was the first to argue to Woolf she had been misdiagnosed, and that it was far better to engage in reading and writing to calm her nerves—advice that was taken. Under the influence of Sackville-West, Woolf learned to deal with her nervous ailments by switching between various forms of intellectual activities such as reading, writing and book reviews, instead of spending her time in physical activities that sapped her strength and worsened her nerves. Sackville-West chose the financially struggling Hogarth Press as her publisher to assist the Woolfs financially. Seducers in Ecuador, the first of the novels by Sackville-West published by Hogarth, was not a success, selling only 1500 copies in its first year, but the next Sackville-West novel they published, The Edwardians, was a best-seller that sold 30,000 copies in its first six months. Sackville-West's novels, though not typical of the Hogarth Press, saved Hogarth, taking them from the red into the black. However, Woolf was not always appreciative of the fact that it was Sackville-West's books that kept the Hogarth Press profitable, writing dismissively in 1933 of her "servant girl" novels. The financial security allowed by the good sales of Sackville-West's novels in turn allowed Woolf to engage in more experimental work, such as The Waves, as Woolf had to be cautious when she depended upon Hogarth entirely for her income.

In 1928, Woolf presented Sackville-West with Orlando, a fantastical biography in which the eponymous hero's life spans three centuries and both sexes. It was published in October, shortly after the two women spent a week travelling together in France, that September. Nigel Nicolson, Vita Sackville-West's son, wrote, "The effect of Vita on Virginia is all contained in Orlando, the longest and most charming love letter in literature, in which she explores Vita, weaves her in and out of the centuries, tosses her from one sex to the other, plays with her, dresses her in furs, lace and emeralds, teases her, flirts with her, drops a veil of mist around her." After their affair ended, the two women remained friends until Woolf's death in 1941. Virginia Woolf also remained close to her surviving siblings, Adrian and Vanessa; Thoby had died of typhoid fever at the age of 26.

Sussex (1911–1941) 

Virginia was needing a country retreat to escape to, and on 24 December 1910, she found a house for rent in Firle, Sussex, near Lewes (see Map). She obtained a lease and took possession of the house the following month, naming it 'Little Talland House', after their childhood home in Cornwall, although it was actually a new red gabled villa on the main street opposite the village hall. The lease was a short one, and in October, she and Leonard Woolf found Asham House at Asheham a few miles to the west, while walking along the Ouse from Firle. The house, at the end of a tree-lined road was a strange beautiful Regency-Gothic house in a lonely location. She described it as "flat, pale, serene, yellow-washed", without electricity or water and allegedly haunted. She took out a five-year lease jointly with Vanessa in the New Year, and they moved into it in February 1912, holding a house warming party on the 9th.

It was at Asham that the Woolfs spent their wedding night later that year. At Asham, she recorded the events of the weekends and holidays they spent there in her Asham Diary, part of which was later published as A Writer's Diary in 1953. In terms of creative writing, The Voyage Out was completed there, and much of Night and Day. Asham provided Woolf with well needed relief from the pace of London life and was where she found a happiness that she expressed in her diary of 5 May 1919 "Oh, but how happy we've been at Asheham! It was a most melodious time. Everything went so freely; – but I can't analyse all the sources of my joy". Asham was also the inspiration for A Haunted House (1921–1944), and was painted by members of the Bloomsbury Group, including Vanessa Bell and Roger Fry. It was during these times at Asham that Ka Cox (seen here) started to devote herself to Virginia and become very useful.

While at Asham Leonard and Virginia found a farmhouse in 1916, that was to let, about four miles away, which they thought would be ideal for her sister. Eventually, Vanessa came down to inspect it, and moved in in October of that year, taking it as a summer home for her family. The Charleston Farmhouse was to become the summer gathering place for the literary and artistic circle of the Bloomsbury Group.

After the end of the war, in 1918, the Woolfs were given a year's notice by the landlord, who needed the house. In mid-1919, "in despair", they purchased "a very strange little house" for £300, the Round House in Pipe Passage, Lewes, a converted windmill. No sooner had they bought the Round House, than Monk's House in nearby Rodmell, came up for auction, a weatherboarded house with oak beamed rooms, said to be 15th or 16th century. The Leonards favoured the latter because of its orchard and garden, and sold the Round House, to purchase Monk's House for £700. Monk's House also lacked water and electricity, but came with an acre of garden, and had a view across the Ouse towards the hills of the South Downs. Leonard Woolf describes this view (and the amenities) as being unchanged since the days of Chaucer. From 1940, it became their permanent home after their London home was bombed, and Virginia continued to live there until her death. Meanwhile, Vanessa made Charleston her permanent home in 1936. It was at Monk's House that Virginia completed Between the Acts in early 1941, followed by a further breakdown directly resulting in her suicide on 28 March 1941, the novel being published posthumously later that year.

The Neo-pagans (1911–1912) 

During her time in Firle, Virginia became better acquainted with Rupert Brooke and his social circle, nicknamed the Neo-Pagans, pursuing socialism, vegetarianism, exercising outdoors and alternative life styles, including social nudity. They were influenced by the ethos of Bedales, Fabianism and Shelley. The women wore sandals, socks, open neck shirts and head-scarves. Although she had some reservations, Woolf was involved with their activities for a while, fascinated by their bucolic innocence in contrast to the sceptical intellectualism of Bloomsbury, which earned her the nickname "The Goat" from her brother Adrian. While Woolf liked to make much of a weekend she spent with Brooke at the vicarage in Grantchester, including swimming in the pool there, it appears to have been principally a literary assignation. They also shared a psychiatrist in the name of Maurice Craig. Through the Neo-Pagans, she finally met Ka Cox on a weekend in Oxford in January 1911, who had been part of the Friday Club circle and now became her friend and played an important part in dealing with her illnesses. Virginia nicknamed her "Bruin". At the same time, she found herself dragged into a triangular relationship involving Ka, Jacques Raverat and Gwen Darwin. She became resentful of the other couple, Jacques and Gwen, who married later in 1911, not the outcome Virginia had predicted or desired. They would later be referred to in both To the Lighthouse and The Years. The exclusion she felt evoked memories of both Stella Duckworth's marriage and her triangular involvement with Vanessa and Clive.

The two groups eventually fell out. Brooke pressured Ka into withdrawing from joining Virginia's ménage on Brunswick Square in late 1911, calling it a "bawdy-house" and by the end of 1912 he had vehemently turned against Bloomsbury. Later, she would write sardonically about Brooke, whose premature death resulted in his idealisation, and express regret about "the Neo-Paganism at that stage of my life". Virginia was deeply disappointed when Ka married William Edward Arnold-Forster in 1918, and became increasingly critical of her.

Mental health 

Much examination has been made of Woolf's mental health (e.g., see Mental health bibliography). From the age of 13, following the death of her mother, Woolf suffered periodic mood swings from severe depression to manic excitement, including psychotic episodes, which the family referred to as her "madness". However, as Hermione Lee points out, Woolf was not "mad"; she was merely a woman who suffered from and struggled with illness for much of her relatively short life, a woman of "exceptional courage, intelligence and stoicism", who made the best use, and achieved the best understanding she could of that illness.

Psychiatrists today contend that her illness constitutes bipolar disorder (manic-depressive illness). Her mother's death in 1895, "the greatest disaster that could happen", precipitated a crisis of alternating excitability and depression accompanied by irrational fears, for which their family doctor, Dr. Seton, prescribed rest, stopping lessons and writing, and regular walks supervised by Stella. Yet just two years later, Stella too was dead, bringing on her next crisis in 1897, and her first expressed wish for death at the age of fifteen, writing in her diary that October that "death would be shorter & less painful". She then stopped keeping a diary for some time. This was a scenario she would later recreate in "Time Passes" (To the Lighthouse, 1927).

The death of her father in 1904 provoked her most alarming collapse, on 10 May, when she threw herself out a window and she was briefly institutionalised under the care of her father's friend, the eminent psychiatrist George Savage. Savage blamed her education—frowned on by many at the time as unsuitable for women—for her illness. She spent time recovering at the house of Stella's friend Violet Dickinson, and at her aunt Caroline's house in Cambridge, and by January 1905, Dr. Savage considered her "cured". Violet, seventeen years older than Virginia, became one of her closest friends and one of her more effective nurses. She characterised it as a "romantic friendship" (Letter to Violet 4 May 1903). Her brother Thoby's death in 1906 marked a "decade of deaths" that ended her childhood and adolescence. Gordon (2004) writes: "Ghostly voices spoke to her with increasing urgency, perhaps more real than the people who lived by her side. When voices of the dead urged her to impossible things, they drove her mad but, controlled, they became the material of fiction..."

On Dr. Savage's recommendation, Virginia spent three short periods in 1910, 1912, and 1913 at Burley House at 15 Cambridge Park, Twickenham (see image), described as "a private nursing home for women with nervous disorder" run by Miss Jean Thomas. By the end of February 1910, she was becoming increasingly restless, and Dr. Savage suggested being away from London. Vanessa rented Moat House, outside Canterbury, in June, but there was no improvement, so Dr. Savage sent her to Burley for a "rest cure". This involved partial isolation, deprivation of literature, and force-feeding, and after six weeks she was able to convalesce in Cornwall and Dorset during the autumn.

She loathed the experience; writing to her sister on 28 July, she described how she found the phony religious atmosphere stifling and the institution ugly, and informed Vanessa that to escape "I shall soon have to jump out of a window." The threat of being sent back would later lead to her contemplating suicide. Despite her protests, Savage would refer her back in 1912 for insomnia and in 1913 for depression.

On emerging from Burley House in September 1913, she sought further opinions from two other physicians on the 13th: Maurice Wright, and Henry Head, who had been Henry James's physician. Both recommended she return to Burley House. Distraught, she returned home and attempted suicide by taking an overdose of 100 grains of veronal (a barbiturate) and nearly dying: she was found by Ka Cox, who summoned help.

On recovery, she went to Dalingridge Hall, George Duckworth's home in East Grinstead, Sussex, to convalesce on 30 September, accompanied by Ka Cox and a nurse, returning to Asham on 18 November with Cox and Janet Case. She remained unstable over the next two years, with another incident involving veronal that she claimed was an "accident", and consulted another psychiatrist in April 1914, Maurice Craig, who explained that she was not sufficiently psychotic to be certified or committed to an institution.

The rest of the summer of 1914 went better for her, and they moved to Richmond, but in February 1915, just as The Voyage Out was due to be published, she relapsed once more, and remained in poor health for most of that year. Then, despite Miss Thomas's gloomy prognosis, she began to recover, following 20 years of ill health. Nevertheless, there was a feeling among those around her that she was now permanently changed, and not for the better.

Over the rest of her life, she suffered recurrent bouts of depression. In 1940, a number of factors appeared to overwhelm her. Her biography of Roger Fry had been published in July, and she had been disappointed in its reception. The horrors of war depressed her, and their London homes had been destroyed in the Blitz in September and October. Woolf had completed Between the Acts (published posthumously in 1941) in November, and completing a novel was frequently accompanied by exhaustion. Her health became increasingly a matter of concern, culminating in her decision to end her life on 28 March 1941.

Though this instability would frequently affect her social life, she was able to continue her literary productivity with few interruptions throughout her life. Woolf herself provides not only a vivid picture of her symptoms in her diaries and letters, but also her response to the demons that haunted her and at times made her long for death: "But it is always a question whether I wish to avoid these glooms... These 9 weeks give one a plunge into deep waters... One goes down into the well & nothing protects one from the assault of truth."

Psychiatry had little to offer Woolf, but she recognised that writing was one of the behaviours that enabled her to cope with her illness: "The only way I keep afloat... is by working... Directly I stop working I feel that I am sinking down, down. And as usual, I feel that if I sink further I shall reach the truth." Sinking under water was Woolf's metaphor for both the effects of depression and psychosis— but also for finding truth, and ultimately was her choice of death.

Throughout her life, Woolf struggled, without success, to find meaning in her illness: on the one hand, an impediment, on the other, something she visualised as an essential part of who she was, and a necessary condition of her art. Her experiences informed her work, such as the character of Septimus Warren Smith in Mrs Dalloway (1925), who, like Woolf, was haunted by the dead, and ultimately takes his own life rather than be admitted to a sanitorium.

Leonard Woolf relates how during the 30 years they were married, they consulted many doctors in the Harley Street area, and although they were given a diagnosis of neurasthenia, he felt they had little understanding of the causes or nature. The proposed solution was simple—as long as she lived a quiet life without any physical or mental exertion, she was well. On the other hand, any mental, emotional, or physical strain resulted in a reappearance of her symptoms, beginning with a headache, followed by insomnia and thoughts that started to race. Her remedy was simple: to retire to bed in a darkened room, eat, and drink plenty of milk, following which the symptoms slowly subsided.

Modern scholars, including her nephew and biographer, Quentin Bell, have suggested her breakdowns and subsequent recurring depressive periods were influenced by the sexual abuse which she and her sister Vanessa were subjected to by their half-brothers George and Gerald Duckworth (which Woolf recalls in her autobiographical essays "A Sketch of the Past" and "22 Hyde Park Gate") (see Sexual abuse). Biographers point out that when Stella died in 1897, there was no counterbalance to control George's predation, and his nighttime prowling. Virginia describes him as her first lover, "The old ladies of Kensington and Belgravia never knew that George Duckworth was not only father and mother, brother and sister to those poor Stephen girls; he was their lover also."

It is likely that other factors also played a part. It has been suggested that they include genetic predisposition, for both trauma and family history have been implicated in bipolar disorder. Virginia's father, Leslie Stephen, suffered from depression, and her half-sister Laura was institutionalised. Many of Virginia's symptoms, including persistent headache, insomnia, irritability, and anxiety, resembled those of her father's. Another factor is the pressure she placed upon herself in her work; for instance, her breakdown of 1913 was at least partly triggered by the need to finish The Voyage Out.

Virginia herself hinted that her illness was related to how she saw the repressed position of women in society, when she wrote in A Room of One's Own that had Shakespeare had a sister of equal genius, she "would certainly have gone crazed, shot herself, or ended her days in some lonely cottage outside the village, half witch, half wizard, feared and mocked at". These inspirations emerged from what Woolf referred to as her lava of madness, describing her time at Burley in a 1930 letter to Ethel Smyth:

Thomas Caramagno and others, in discussing her illness, oppose the "neurotic-genius" way of looking at mental illness, where creativity and mental illness are conceptualised as linked rather than antithetical. Stephen Trombley describes Woolf as having a confrontational relationship with her doctors, and possibly being a woman who is a "victim of male medicine", referring to the lack of understanding, particularly at the time, about mental illness.

Death 

After completing the manuscript of her last novel (posthumously published), Between the Acts (1941), Woolf fell into a depression similar to one which she had earlier experienced. The onset of World War II, the destruction of her London home during the Blitz, and the cool reception given to her biography of her late friend Roger Fry all worsened her condition until she was unable to work. When Leonard enlisted in the Home Guard, Virginia disapproved. She held fast to her pacifism and criticised her husband for wearing what she considered to be "the silly uniform of the Home Guard".

After World War II began, Woolf's diary indicates that she was obsessed with death, which figured more and more as her mood darkened. On 28 March 1941, Woolf drowned herself by filling her overcoat pockets with stones and walking into the River Ouse near her home. Her body was not found until 18 April. Her husband buried her cremated remains beneath an elm tree in the garden of Monk's House, their home in Rodmell, Sussex.

In her suicide note, addressed to her husband, she wrote:

Work

Woolf is considered to be one of the more important 20th century novelists. A modernist, she was one of the pioneers of using stream of consciousness as a narrative device, alongside contemporaries such as Marcel Proust, Dorothy Richardson and James Joyce. Woolf's reputation was at its greatest during the 1930s, but declined considerably following World War II. The growth of feminist criticism in the 1970s helped re-establish her reputation.

Virginia submitted her first article in 1890, to a competition in Tit-Bits. Although it was rejected, this shipboard romance by the 8-year-old would presage her first novel 25 years later, as would contributions to the Hyde Park News, such as the model letter "to show young people the right way to express what is in their hearts", a subtle commentary on her mother's legendary matchmaking. She transitioned from juvenilia to professional journalism in 1904 at the age of 22. Violet Dickinson introduced her to Mrs. Lyttelton, the editor of the Women's Supplement of The Guardian, a Church of England newspaper. Invited to submit a 1,500-word article, Virginia sent Lyttelton a review of W.D. Howells' The Son of Royal Langbirth and an essay about her visit to Haworth that year, Haworth, November 1904. The review was published anonymously on 4 December, and the essay on the 21st. In 1905, Woolf began writing for The Times Literary Supplement.

Woolf would go on to publish novels and essays as a public intellectual to both critical and popular acclaim. Much of her work was self-published through the Hogarth Press. "Virginia Woolf's peculiarities as a fiction writer have tended to obscure her central strength: she is arguably the major lyrical novelist in the English language. Her novels are highly experimental: a narrative, frequently uneventful and commonplace, is refracted—and sometimes almost dissolved—in the characters' receptive consciousness. Intense lyricism and stylistic virtuosity fuse to create a world overabundant with auditory and visual impressions." "The intensity of Virginia Woolf's poetic vision elevates the ordinary, sometimes banal settings"—often wartime environments—"of most of her novels."

Fiction and drama

Novels 

Her first novel, The Voyage Out, was published in 1915 at the age of 33, by her half-brother's imprint, Gerald Duckworth and Company Ltd. This novel was originally titled Melymbrosia, but Woolf repeatedly changed the draft. An earlier version of The Voyage Out has been reconstructed by Woolf scholar Louise DeSalvo and is now available to the public under the intended title. DeSalvo argues that many of the changes Woolf made in the text were in response to changes in her own life. The novel is set on a ship bound for South America, and a group of young Edwardians onboard and their various mismatched yearnings and misunderstandings. In the novel are hints of themes that would emerge in later work, including the gap between preceding thought and the spoken word that follows, and the lack of concordance between expression and underlying intention, together with how these reveal to us aspects of the nature of love.

"Mrs Dalloway (1925) centres on the efforts of Clarissa Dalloway, a middle-aged society woman, to organise a party, even as her life is paralleled with that of Septimus Warren Smith, a working-class veteran who has returned from the First World War bearing deep psychological scars".

"To the Lighthouse (1927) is set on two days ten years apart. The plot centres on the Ramsay family's anticipation of and reflection upon a visit to a lighthouse and the connected familial tensions. One of the primary themes of the novel is the struggle in the creative process that beset painter Lily Briscoe while she struggles to paint in the midst of the family drama. The novel is also a meditation upon the lives of a nation's inhabitants in the midst of war, and of the people left behind." It also explores the passage of time, and how women are forced by society to allow men to take emotional strength from them.

Orlando: A Biography (1928) is one of Virginia Woolf's lightest novels. A parodic biography of a young nobleman who lives for three centuries without ageing much past thirty (but who does abruptly turn into a woman), the book is in part a portrait of Woolf's lover Vita Sackville-West. It was meant to console Vita for the loss of her ancestral home, Knole House, though it is also a satirical treatment of Vita and her work. In Orlando, the techniques of historical biographers are being ridiculed; the character of a pompous biographer is being assumed for it to be mocked.

"The Waves (1931) presents a group of six friends whose reflections, which are closer to recitatives than to interior monologues proper, create a wave-like atmosphere that is more akin to a prose poem than to a plot-centred novel".

Flush: A Biography (1933) is a part-fiction, part-biography of the cocker spaniel owned by Victorian poet Elizabeth Barrett Browning. The book is written from the dog's point of view. Woolf was inspired to write this book from the success of the Rudolf Besier play The Barretts of Wimpole Street. In the play, Flush is on stage for much of the action.

The Years (1936), traces the history of the genteel Pargiter family from the 1880s to the "present day" of the mid-1930s. The novel had its origin in a lecture Woolf gave to the National Society for Women's Service in 1931, an edited version of which would later be published as "Professions for Women". Woolf first thought of making this lecture the basis of a new book-length essay on women, this time taking a broader view of their economic and social life, rather than focusing on women as artists, as the first book had. She soon jettisoned the theoretical framework of her "novel-essay" and began to rework the book solely as a fictional narrative, but some of the non-fiction material she first intended for this book was later used in Three Guineas (1938).

"Her last work, Between the Acts (1941), sums up and magnifies Woolf's chief preoccupations: the transformation of life through art, sexual ambivalence, and meditation on the themes of flux of time and life, presented simultaneously as corrosion and rejuvenation—all set in a highly imaginative and symbolic narrative encompassing almost all of English history." This book is the most lyrical of all her works, not only in feeling but in style, being chiefly written in verse. While Woolf's work can be understood as consistently in dialogue with the Bloomsbury Group, particularly its tendency (informed by G.E. Moore, among others) towards doctrinaire rationalism, it is not a simple recapitulation of the coterie's ideals.

Themes 
Woolf's fiction has been studied for its insight into many themes including war, shell shock, witchcraft, and the role of social class in contemporary modern British society. In the postwar Mrs Dalloway (1925), Woolf addresses the moral dilemma of war and its effects and provides an authentic voice for soldiers returning from World War I, suffering from shell shock, in the person of Septimus Smith. In A Room of One's Own (1929) Woolf equates historical accusations of witchcraft with creativity and genius among women "When, however, one reads of a witch being ducked, of a woman possessed by devils...then I think we are on the track of a lost novelist, a suppressed poet, of some mute and inglorious Jane Austen". Throughout her work Woolf tried to evaluate the degree to which her privileged background framed the lens through which she viewed class. She both examined her own position as someone who would be considered an elitist snob, but attacked the class structure of Britain as she found it. In her 1936 essay Am I a Snob?, she examined her values and those of the privileged circle she existed in. She concluded she was, and subsequent critics and supporters have tried to deal with the dilemma of being both elite and a social critic.

The sea is a recurring motif in Woolf's work. Noting Woolf's early memory of listening to waves break in Cornwall, Katharine Smyth writes in The Paris Review that "the radiance [of] cresting water would be consecrated again and again in her writing, saturating not only essays, diaries, and letters but also Jacob's Room, The Waves, and To the Lighthouse." Patrizia A. Muscogiuri explains that "seascapes, sailing, diving and the sea itself are aspects of nature and of human beings' relationship with it which frequently inspired Virginia Woolf's writing." This trope is deeply embedded in her texts' structure and grammar; James Antoniou notes in Sydney Morning Herald how "Woolf made a virtue of the semicolon, the shape and function of which resembles the wave, her most famous motif."

Despite the considerable conceptual difficulties, given Woolf's idiosyncratic use of language, her works have been translated into over 50 languages. Some writers, such as the Belgian Marguerite Yourcenar, had rather tense encounters with her, while others, such as the Argentinian Jorge Luis Borges, produced versions that were highly controversial.

Drama 

Virginia Woolf researched the life of her great-aunt, the photographer Julia Margaret Cameron, publishing her findings in an essay titled "Pattledom" (1925), and later in her introduction to her 1926 edition of Cameron's photographs. She had begun work on a play based on an episode in Cameron's life in 1923, but abandoned it. Finally it was performed on 18 January 1935 at the studio of her sister, Vanessa Bell on Fitzroy Street in 1935. Woolf directed it herself, and the cast were mainly members of the Bloomsbury Group, including herself. Freshwater is a short three act comedy satirising the Victorian era, only performed once in Woolf's lifetime. Beneath the comedic elements, there is an exploration of both generational change and artistic freedom. Both Cameron and Woolf fought against the class and gender dynamics of Victorianism and the play shows links to both To the Lighthouse and A Room of One's Own that would follow.

Non-fiction 
Woolf wrote a body of autobiographical work and more than 500 essays and reviews, some of which, like A Room of One's Own (1929) were of book length. Not all were published in her lifetime. Shortly after her death, Leonard Woolf produced an edited edition of unpublished essays titled The Moment and other Essays, published by the Hogarth Press in 1947. Many of these were originally lectures that she gave, and several more volumes of essays followed, such as The Captain's Death Bed: and other essays (1950).

A Room of One's Own 

Among Woolf's non-fiction works, one of the best known is A Room of One's Own (1929), a book-length essay. Considered a key work of feminist literary criticism, it was written following two lectures she delivered on "Women and Fiction" at Cambridge University the previous year. In it, she examines the historical disempowerment women have faced in many spheres, including social, educational and financial. One of her more famous dicta is contained within the book "A woman must have money and a room of her own if she is to write fiction". Much of her argument ("to show you how I arrived at this opinion about the room and the money") is developed through the "unsolved problems" of women and fiction writing to arrive at her conclusion, although she claimed that was only "an opinion upon one minor point". In doing so, she states a good deal about the nature of women and fiction, employing a quasi-fictional style as she examines where women writers failed because of lack of resources and opportunities, examining along the way the experiences of the Brontës, George Eliot and George Sand, as well as the fictional character of Shakespeare's sister, equipped with the same genius but not position. She contrasted these women who accepted a deferential status with Jane Austen, who wrote entirely as a woman.

Influences 
Michel Lackey argues that a major influence on Woolf, from 1912 onward, was Russian literature and Woolf adopted many of its aesthetic conventions. The style of Fyodor Dostoyevsky with his depiction of a fluid mind in operation helped to influence Woolf's writings about a "discontinuous writing process", though Woolf objected to Dostoyevsky's obsession with "psychological extremity" and the "tumultuous flux of emotions" in his characters together with his right-wing, monarchist politics as Dostoyevsky was an ardent supporter of the autocracy of the Russian Empire. In contrast to her objections to Dostoyevsky's "exaggerated emotional pitch", Woolf found much to admire in the work of Anton Chekhov and Leo Tolstoy. Woolf admired Chekhov for his stories of ordinary people living their lives, doing banal things and plots that had no neat endings. From Tolstoy, Woolf drew lessons about how a novelist should depict a character's psychological state and the interior tension within. Lackey notes that, from Ivan Turgenev, Woolf drew the lessons that there are multiple "I's" when writing a novel, and the novelist needed to balance those multiple versions of him- or herself to balance the "mundane facts" of a story vs. the writer's overarching vision, which required a "total passion" for art.

The American writer Henry David Thoreau also influenced Woolf. In a 1917 essay, she praised Thoreau for his statement "The millions are awake enough for physical labor, but only one in hundreds of millions is awake enough to a poetic or divine life. To be awake is to be alive." They both aimed to capture 'the moment'––as Walter Pater says, "to burn always with this hard, gem-like flame."  Woolf praised Thoreau for his "simplicity" in finding "a way for setting free the delicate and complicated machinery of the soul". Like Thoreau, Woolf believed that it was silence that set the mind free to really contemplate and understand the world. Both authors believed in a certain transcendental, mystical approach to life and writing, where even banal things could be capable of generating deep emotions if one had enough silence and the presence of mind to appreciate them. Woolf and Thoreau were both concerned with the difficulty of human relationships in the modern age.

Woolf's preface to Orlando credits Daniel Defoe, Sir Thomas Browne, Laurence Sterne, Sir Walter Scott, Lord Macaulay, Emily Brontë, Thomas de Quincey, and Walter Pater as influences. Among her contemporaries, Woolf was influenced by Marcel Proust, writing to Roger Fry, "Oh if I could write like that!"

List of selected publications 

Novels 
  see also The Voyage Out & Complete text  
  see also Night and Day & Complete text 
  see also Jacob's Room & Complete text 
  see also Mrs Dalloway & Complete text 
  see also To the Lighthouse & Complete text, also Texts at Woolf Online 
  see also Orlando: A Biography & Complete text 
  see also The Waves & Complete text 
 
   see also Between the Acts & Complete text

Short stories 
  see also A Haunted House and Other Short Stories & Complete text 
  see also The Mark on the Wall & Complete text 
  see also Kew Gardens & Complete text

Cross-genre 
   see also Flush: A Biography & Complete text

Drama 
  see also Freshwater

Biography 
  see also Roger Fry: A Biography & Complete text

Essays 
 
  see also A Room of One's Own & Complete text 
  see also Mr. Bennett and Mrs. Brown & Complete text 
  see also A Letter to a Young Poet & Complete text 
  see also Three Guineas & Complete text

Essay collections 
 
 
  (Review)
 
 
 
  (Review)
 
  Complete text 
 
  (Review)
  First American edition published by Harcourt, Brace and Company, New York, 1950.
  & also here 
 — (1934). "Walter Sickert: A Conversation" .

Contributions 

  (Digital edition)

Autobiographical writing 
 
  (Review)
  (see Moments of Being)

 , in 
 
  (excerpts – 1st ed.)
Memoir Club Contributions

Diaries and notebooks

Letters 
 
 
 
 
 
 
  (Review)

Photograph albums 
 
 List of Album Guides 

 
 Album 1 MS Thr 557 (1863–1938) 
 Album 2 MS Thr 559 (1909–1922) 
 Album 3 MS Thr 560 (1890–1933) 
 Album 4 MS Thr 561 (1890–1947) 
 Album 5 MS Thr 562 (1892–1938) 
 Album 6 MS Thr 563 (1850–1900)

Collections

Views 
In her lifetime, Woolf was outspoken on many topics that were considered controversial, some of which are now considered progressive, others regressive. She was an ardent feminist at a time when women's rights were barely recognised, and anti-colonialist, anti-imperialist and a pacifist when chauvinism was popular. On the other hand, she has been criticised for views on class and race in her private writings and published works. Like many of her contemporaries, some of her writing is now considered offensive. As a result, she is considered polarising, a revolutionary feminist and socialist hero or a purveyor of hate speech.

Works such as A Room of One's Own (1929) and Three Guineas (1938) are frequently taught as icons of feminist literature in courses that would be very critical of some of her views expressed elsewhere. She has also been the recipient of considerable homophobic and misogynist criticism.

Humanist views 
Virginia Woolf was born into a non-religious family and is regarded, along with her fellow Bloomsberries E.M. Forster and G.E. Moore, as a humanist. Both her parents were prominent agnostic atheists. Her father, Leslie Stephen, had become famous in polite society for his writings which expressed and publicised reasons to doubt the veracity of religion. Stephen was also President of the West London Ethical Society, an early humanist organisation, and helped to found the Union of Ethical Societies in 1896. Woolf's mother, Julia Stephen, wrote the book Agnostic Women (1880), which argued that agnosticism (defined here as something more like atheism) could be a highly moral approach to life.

Woolf was a critic of Christianity. In a letter to Ethel Smyth, she gave a scathing denunciation of the religion, seeing it as self-righteous "egotism" and stating "my Jew [Leonard] has more religion in one toenail—more human love, in one hair". Woolf stated in her private letters that she thought of herself as an atheist.

Controversies 
Hermione Lee cites a number of extracts from Woolf's writings that many, including Lee, would consider offensive, and these criticisms can be traced back as far as those of Wyndham Lewis and Q.D. Leavis in the 1920s and 1930s. Other authors provide more nuanced contextual interpretations, and stress the complexity of her character and the apparent inherent contradictions in analysing her apparent flaws. She could certainly be off-hand, rude and even cruel in her dealings with other authors, translators and biographers, such as her treatment of Ruth Gruber. Some authors, particularly postcolonial feminists dismiss her (and modernist authors in general) as privileged, elitist, classist, racist, and antisemitic.

Woolf's tendentious expressions, including prejudicial feelings against disabled people, have often been the topic of academic criticism:
 The first quotation is from a diary entry of September 1920 and runs: "The fact is the lower classes are detestable." The remainder follow the first in reproducing stereotypes standard to upper-class and upper-middle class life in the early 20th century: "imbeciles should certainly be killed"; "Jews" are greasy; a "crowd" is both an ontological "mass" and is, again, "detestable"; "Germans" are akin to vermin; some "baboon faced intellectuals" mix with "sad green dressed negroes and negresses, looking like chimpanzees" at a peace conference; Kensington High St. revolts one's stomach with its innumerable "women of incredible mediocrity, drab as dishwater".

Antisemitism
Often accused of antisemitism, the treatment of Judaism and Jews by Woolf is far from straightforward. She was happily married to an assimilated Jewish man (Leonard Woolf) who had no connection with or knowledge of his people while she generally characterized Jewish characters with negative stereotypes. For instance, she described some of the Jewish characters in her work in terms that suggested they were physically repulsive or dirty. On the other hand, she could criticise her own views: "How I hated marrying a Jew — how I hated their nasal voices and their oriental jewellery, and their noses and their wattles — what a snob I was: for they have immense vitality, and I think I like that quality best of all" (Letter to Ethel Smyth 1930). These attitudes have been construed to reflect, not so much antisemitism, but social status; she married outside her social class. Leonard, "a penniless Jew from Putney", lacked the material status of the Stephens and their circle.

While travelling on a cruise to Portugal, she protested at finding "a great many Portuguese Jews on board, and other repulsive objects, but we keep clear of them". Furthermore, she wrote in her diary: "I do not like the Jewish voice; I do not like the Jewish laugh." Her 1938 short story, written during Hitler's reign, The Duchess and the Jeweller (originally titled The Duchess and the Jew) has been considered antisemitic.

Some believe that Woolf and her husband Leonard came to despise and fear the 1930s fascism and antisemitism. Her 1938 book Three Guineas was an indictment of fascism and what Woolf described as a recurring propensity among patriarchal societies to enforce repressive societal mores by violence. And yet, her 1938 story "The Duchess and the Jeweler" was so deep in its hateful depiction of Jews that Harper's Bazaar asked her to modify it before publication. She reluctantly complied.

Sexuality

The Bloomsbury Group held very progressive views regarding sexuality and rejected the austere strictness of Victorian society. The majority of its members were homosexual or bisexual.

Woolf had several affairs with women, the most notable being with Vita Sackville-West. The two women developed a deep connection; Vita was arguably one of the few people in Virginia's adult life that she was truly close to.

During their relationship, both women saw the peak of their literary careers, with the titular protagonist of Woolf's acclaimed Orlando: A Biography being inspired by Sackville-West. The pair remained lovers for a decade and stayed close friends for the rest of Woolf's life. Woolf had said to Sackville-West she disliked masculinity.

Among her other notable affairs were those with Sibyl Colefax, Lady Ottoline Morrell, and Mary Hutchinson. Some surmise that she may have fallen in love with Madge Symonds, the wife of one of her uncles. Madge Symonds was described as one of Woolf's early loves in Sackville-West's diary. She also fell in love with Violet Dickinson, although there is some confusion as to whether the two consummated their relationship.

In regards to relationships with men, Woolf was averse to sex with them, blaming the sexual abuse perpetrated upon her and her sister by her half-brothers when they were children and teens. This is one of the reasons she initially declined marriage proposals from her future husband, Leonard. She even went as far as to tell him that she was not attracted to him, but that she did love him and finally agreed to marriage. Woolf preferred female lovers to male lovers, for the most part, based on her aversion to sex with men. This aversion to relations with men influenced her writing especially when considering her sexual abuse as a child.

Leonard became the love of her life and even though their sexual relationship was questionable, they loved each other deeply and formed a strong, supportive and prolific marriage which led to the formation of their publishing house as well as several of her writings. Neither was faithful to the other sexually, but they were faithful in their love and respect for each other.

Modern scholarship and interpretations 
Though at least one biography of Virginia Woolf appeared in her lifetime, the first authoritative study of her life was published in 1972 by her nephew Quentin Bell. Hermione Lee's 1996 biography Virginia Woolf provides a thorough and authoritative examination of Woolf's life and work, which she discussed in an interview in 1997. In 2001, Louise DeSalvo and Mitchell A. Leaska edited The Letters of Vita Sackville-West and Virginia Woolf. Julia Briggs's Virginia Woolf: An Inner Life (2005) focuses on Woolf's writing, including her novels and her commentary on the creative process, to illuminate her life. The sociologist Pierre Bourdieu also uses Woolf's literature to understand and analyse gender domination. Woolf biographer Gillian Gill notes that Woolf's traumatic experience of sexual abuse by her half-brothers during her childhood influenced her advocacy of protection of vulnerable children from similar experiences.

Virginia Woolf and her mother 
The intense scrutiny of Virginia Woolf's literary output (see Bibliography) has led to speculation as to her mother's influence, including psychoanalytic studies of mother and daughter. Woolf states that, "my first memory, and in fact it is the most important of all my memories" is of her mother. Her memories of her mother are memories of an obsession, starting with her first major breakdown on her mother's death in 1895, the loss having a profound lifelong effect. In many ways, her mother's profound influence on Virginia Woolf is conveyed in the latter's recollections, "there she is; beautiful, emphatic ... closer than any of the living are, lighting our random lives as with a burning torch, infinitely noble and delightful to her children".

Woolf described her mother as an "invisible presence" in her life, and Ellen Rosenman argues that the mother-daughter relationship is a constant in Woolf's writing. She describes how Woolf's modernism needs to be viewed in relationship to her ambivalence towards her Victorian mother, the centre of the former's female identity, and her voyage to her own sense of autonomy. To Woolf, "Saint Julia" was both a martyr whose perfectionism was intimidating and a source of deprivation, by her absences real and virtual and premature death. Julia's influence and memory pervades Woolf's life and work. "She has haunted me", she wrote.

Historical feminism 
According to the 2007 book Feminism: From Mary Wollstonecraft to Betty Friedan by Bhaskar A. Shukla, "Recently, studies of Virginia Woolf have focused on feminist and lesbian themes in her work, such as in the 1997 collection of critical essays, Virginia Woolf: Lesbian Readings, edited by Eileen Barrett and Patricia Cramer." In 1928, Woolf took a grassroots approach to informing and inspiring feminism. She addressed undergraduate women at the ODTAA Society at Girton College, Cambridge and the Arts Society at Newnham College with two papers that eventually became A Room of One's Own (1929).

Woolf's best-known nonfiction works, A Room of One's Own (1929) and Three Guineas (1938), examine the difficulties that female writers and intellectuals faced because men held disproportionate legal and economic power, as well as the future of women in education and society. In The Second Sex (1949), Simone de Beauvoir counts, of all women who ever lived, only three female writers—Emily Brontë, Woolf and "sometimes" Katherine Mansfield— have explored "the given".

In popular culture 

 Who's Afraid of Virginia Woolf? is a 1962 play by Edward Albee. It examines the structure of the marriage of an American middle-aged academic couple, Martha and George. Mike Nichols directed a film version in 1966, starring Elizabeth Taylor and Richard Burton. Taylor won the 1966 Academy Award for Best Actress for the role.
Me! I'm Afraid of Virginia Woolf, a 1978 TV play, references the title of the Edward Albee play and features an English literature teacher who has a poster of her. It was written by Alan Bennett and directed by Stephen Frears.
 The artwork The Dinner Party (1979) features a place setting for Woolf.
 The Bechdel test, a measure of the representation of women in fiction, was first published in the 1985 comic Dykes to Watch Out For is credited by the author, Alison Bechdel to friend Liz Wallace and the writings of Virginia Woolf. After the test became more widely discussed in the 2000s, a number of variants and tests inspired by it emerged.
 The album, Rites of Passage by American folk rock duo the Indigo Girls, released on May 12, 1992 contains the song "Virginia Woolf" written by Emily Saliers.
 The 1996 album Poetic Justice, by British musician Steve Harley, contains a tribute to Woolf, specifically her most adventurous novel, in its closing track: "Riding the Waves (for Virginia Woolf)".
 Michael Cunningham's 1998 Pulitzer Prize-winning novel The Hours focused on three generations of women affected by Woolf's novel Mrs Dalloway. In 2002, a film version of the novel was released, starring Nicole Kidman as Woolf. Kidman won the 2003 Academy Award for her portrayal.
 Susan Sellers's novel Vanessa and Virginia (2008) explores the close sibling relationship between Woolf and her sister, Vanessa Bell. It was adapted for the stage by Elizabeth Wright in 2010 and first performed by Moving Stories Theatre Company.
 "What the Water Gave Me", a 2011 song by the band Florence and The Machine, was inspired by Woolf's suicide.
 Priya Parmar's 2014 novel Vanessa and Her Sister also examined the Stephen sisters' relationship during the early years of their association with what became known as the Bloomsbury Group.
 An exhibition on Virginia Woolf was held at the National Portrait Gallery from July to October 2014.
 In the 2014 novel The House at the End of Hope Street, Woolf is featured as one of the women who has lived in the titular house.
 Virginia is portrayed by both Lydia Leonard and Catherine McCormack in the BBC's three-part drama series Life in Squares (2015).
 On 25 January 2018, Google showed a Google doodle celebrating her 136th birthday.
In many Barnes & Noble stores, Woolf is featured in Gary Kelly's Author Mural Panels, an imprint of the Barnes & Noble Author brand that also features other notable authors like Hurston, Tagore, and Kafka.
The 2018 film Vita and Virginia depicts the relationship between Vita Sackville-West and Woolf, portrayed by Gemma Arterton and Elizabeth Debicki respectively.
The 2020 novel Trio by William Boyd follows the life of Elfrida Wing, an alcoholic writer interested in the suicide of Woolf.

Adaptations 
Sally Potter adapted Orlando (1928) for the screen in 1992. The film starred Tilda Swinton. Woolf's play Freshwater (1935) is the basis for a 1994 chamber opera, Freshwater, by Andy Vores. The final segment of the 2018 London Unplugged is adapted from her short story Kew Gardens. Septimus and Clarissa, a stage adaptation of Mrs. Dalloway was created and produced by the New York-based ensemble Ripe Time in 2011 at the Baruch Performing Arts Center. It was adapted by Ellen McLaughlin, and directed and devised by Rachel Dickstein. It was nominated for a 2012 Drama League award for Outstanding Production, a Drama Desk nomination for Outstanding Score (Gina Leishman) and a Joe A. Calloway Award nomination for outstanding direction (Rachel Dickstein.)

Legacy 

Virginia Woolf is known for her contributions to 20th-century literature and her essays, as well as the influence she has had on literary, particularly feminist criticism. A number of authors have stated that their work was influenced by her, including Margaret Atwood, Michael Cunningham, Gabriel García Márquez, and Toni Morrison. Her iconic image is instantly recognisable from the Beresford portrait of her at twenty (at the top of this page) to the Beck and Macgregor portrait in her mother's dress in Vogue at 44 (see image) or Man Ray's cover of Time magazine (see image) at 55. More postcards of Woolf are sold by the National Portrait Gallery, London than any other person. Her image is ubiquitous, and can be found on products ranging from tea towels to T-shirts.

Virginia Woolf is studied around the world, with organisations such as the Virginia Woolf Society, and The Virginia Woolf Society of Japan. In addition, trusts—such as the Asham Trust—encourage writers in her honour. Although she had no descendants, a number of her extended family are notable.

Monuments and memorials 

In 2013, Woolf was honoured by her alma mater of King's College London with the opening of the Virginia Woolf Building on Kingsway, with a plaque commemorating her time there and her contributions (see image), together with this exhibit depicting her accompanied by a quotation "London itself perpetually attracts, stimulates, gives me a play & a story & a poem" from her 1926 diary. Busts of Virginia Woolf have been erected at her home in Rodmell, Sussex and at Tavistock Square, London where she lived between 1924 and 1939.

In 2014, she was one of the inaugural honorees in the Rainbow Honor Walk, a walk of fame in San Francisco's Castro neighbourhood noting LGBTQ people who have "made significant contributions in their fields".

Woolf Works, a women's co-working space in Singapore, opened in 2014 and was named after her in tribute to the essay A Room of One's Own; it also has many other things named after it (see the essay's article).
A campaign was launched in 2018 by Aurora Metro Arts and Media to erect a statue of Woolf in Richmond, where she lived for 10 years. The statue shows her on a bench overlooking the river Thames. In November 2022 the statue, created by sculptor Laury Dizengremel, was unveiled. It is the first full-size statue of Woolf.

Family trees 

|

Notes

References

Bibliography

Books and theses 
 
  see also The Second Sex
 
 
 
 
 
 
 
 
 
 
 
 
 
 
 
 
 
 
 
 
  see also Survey of London
 
 
 
  (Review)

Biography: Virginia Woolf 
 
 
 Vol. I: Virginia Stephen 1882 to 1912.  London: Hogarth Press. 1972.
 Vol. II:  Virginia Woolf 1912 to 1941.  London: Hogarth Press. 1972.
 
 
  (Review)
 
 
 
 
 
 
 
 
 
  (Review)
  (Review)
  (additional excerpts)
 
 
 
 
 
 
 
  (Review)
 
 
 
 
  (excerpt - Chapter 1)
  (Review)
  
 
 
 
  (Review)
 
 
 
 
 
  (Review)
 
 
 
 
 

Mental health 
  additional excerpts 
  (summary)
 
  see also Touched with Fire

Biography: Other 
 
 
 
  (Review)
 
 
 
 
 
 
 
 
  (Review)
 
  (Review)
 
  (Review)
 
  (Review)
  (Review)
 
 
 
 
 
 
 
 
 
 
  also Internet archive
  also available through MOMA here

Literary commentary 
 
 
 
 
 
 
 
 
 
 
 
 
  (additional excerpts)
 
 
 
 
 
 
 
 
 
  (Review)
 
 
 
 
 
 
 
 
 
 
 
 
 
  additional excerpt 
 
 
  (Review)
  (Review)
  (Review)

Bloomsbury 
 
  (additional excerpts)
 
 
 
  (Review)

Chapters and contributions 
 , in 
 , in 
 , in 
 , in 
 , in 
 , in 
 , in 
 , in 
 , in 
 , in 
 , in 
 , in 
 , in 
 , in 
 , in 
 , in

Articles 
Journals

 
 
 
 
 
 
 
 
 
 
 
 
 
 
 
 
 
 
 
 
 
 
 
 
 
 
 
 
  (text also available here)
 
 
 
 
 

Dictionaries and encyclopaedias

 
 
 
   
 
 

Newspapers and magazines

 
 
 
 
 
 
 
 
 
 
 
  
  archived version
 
 
  archived version
 
 
 
 
 
 
 
 
 
 
 
  with excerpt

Websites and documents 
 
 
 
 
 
 
 
 
 
  (includes invitation to first performance in 1935 and Lucio Ruotolo's introduction to the 1976 Hogarth Press edition)
 
 
 
 
 
 
 
 
 
 
 
 
 
 
 
 
 

Blogs

 
 
 

British Library

Literary commentary 
 
 
 
 

British Library

Virginia Woolf's homes and venues 
 
 
 
 
 
 
 , in 
 
  
 
 , in

Virginia Woolf biography

Timelines 
 
 , in 
 , in 
 , in }
 , in

Genealogy 
 
 
 
 , in

Images 
 
 
 
 
 
 , in 
 , in 
 , in

Maps 
 
 , in

Audiovisual media 
  see also Life in Squares
 
  
  excerpt

Selected online texts 
 
 
Audiofiles

Archival material

Bibliography notes

Bibliography references

External links
 
 
 
 Virginia Woolf Papers at the Mortimer Rare Book Collection, Smith College Special Collections

 
1882 births
1941 suicides
19th-century atheists
19th-century British short story writers
19th-century British women
19th-century British writers
19th-century diarists
19th-century English women
19th-century English writers
19th-century letter writers
19th-century English LGBT people
20th-century atheists
20th-century biographers
20th-century British dramatists and playwrights
20th-century British novelists
20th-century British short story writers
20th-century British women writers
20th-century diarists
20th-century English dramatists and playwrights
20th-century English novelists
20th-century English women writers
20th-century essayists
20th-century letter writers
20th-century LGBT people
20th-century memoirists
20th-century non-fiction writers
20th-century translators
Alumni of King's College London
Atheist feminists
Bisexual women
Bloomsbury Group
Bloomsbury Group biographers
British anti-fascists
British atheists
British autobiographers
British biographers
British diarists
British essayists
British feminist writers
British feminists
British humanists
British literary critics
British memoirists
British pacifists
British secularists
British social commentators
British socialists
British translators
British women dramatists and playwrights
British women essayists
British women memoirists
British women novelists
British women short story writers
Critics of Christianity
Critics of Judaism
Critics of new religious movements
Critics of religions
Dreadnought hoax
English anti-fascists
English atheists
English autobiographers
English biographers
English diarists
English essayists
English feminist writers
English feminists
English humanists
English literary critics
English memoirists
English pacifists
English short story writers
English socialists
English translators
English women dramatists and playwrights
English women novelists
Female suicides
Lecturers
Bisexual memoirists
English LGBT writers
Literacy and society theorists
Literary theorists
Lost Generation writers
Mental health activists
Modernist women writers
Modernist writers
People from Firle
People from Kensington
People with bipolar disorder
Stephen-Bell family
Suicides by drowning in England
Surrealist poets
Surrealist writers
Women diarists
Writers about activism and social change
Writers from London
Writers of historical fiction set in the early modern period
Writers of historical fiction set in the modern age